New Socialist Party (NPS) is an organized caucus in the French Socialist Party. The NPS made up part of the left wing of the party. The NPS was founded in October 2002 by Arnaud Montebourg, Vincent Peillon, Julien Dray (former member of the Socialist Left) and Benoît Hamon.

At the Dijon Congress in 2003, the NPS motion obtained 16.88%. At the 2005 Le Mans Congress, the NPS motion obtained 23.54%. However, the NPS imploded following the Le Mans Congress, with Arnaud Montebourg founding the Renovate Now faction and Peillon, Hamon, and Emmanuelle continuing a rump NPS.

The rump NPS split again before the Reims Congress in 2008, when Peillon left the NPS, which supported Benoît Hamon's motion, to support Ségolène Royal's motion.

2002 establishments in France
2008 disestablishments in France
Democratic socialism
Factions of the Socialist Party (France)
Political parties established in 2002
Political party factions in France